Balcones Heights is a city in Bexar County, Texas, United States. The population was 2,746 at the 2020 census, and it was incorporated in 1948. Balcones Heights is an enclave of San Antonio, surrounded entirely by the city, thus some residents and out-of-town visitors erroneously consider it merely a neighborhood of the larger city rather than its own unique community which did so to prevent annexation.

Geography

Balcones Heights is located at  (29.489729, –98.547927), 9 miles northwest of Downtown San Antonio.

None of the area is covered with water.

Demographics

As of the 2020 United States census, there were 2,746 people, 1,461 households, and 558 families residing in the city.

As of the census of 2000, there were 3,016 people, 1,437 households, and 708 families residing in the city. The population density was 4,674.6 people per square mile (1,791.5/km2). There were 1,539 housing units at an average density of 2,385.4 per square mile (914.2/km2). The racial makeup of the city was 69.66% White, 5.37% African American, 1.56% Native American, 1.13% Asian, 0.03% Pacific Islander, 17.41% from other races, and 4.84% from two or more races. Hispanic or Latino of any race were 69.60% of the population.

There were 1,437 households, out of which 27.2% had children under the age of 18 living with them, 26.2% were married couples living together, 18.2% had a female householder with no husband present, and 50.7% were non-families. 43.6% of all households were made up of individuals, and 7.7% had someone living alone who was 65 years of age or older. The average household size was 2.10 and the average family size was 2.92.

In the city, the population was spread out, with 23.7% under the age of 18, 14.5% from 18 to 24, 33.1% from 25 to 44, 19.5% from 45 to 64, and 9.2% who were 65 years of age or older. The median age was 32 years. For every 100 females, there were 107.1 males. For every 100 females age 18 and over, there were 107.1 males.

The median income for a household in the city was $21,452, and the median income for a family was $27,074. Males had a median income of $21,209 versus $18,944 for females. The per capita income for the city was $13,529. About 18.1% of families and 21.1% of the population were below the poverty line, including 23.6% of those under age 18 and 15.2% of those age 65 or over.

Education 

Most of the city is served by San Antonio Independent School District. Most residents of the San Antonio ISD section are zoned to Baskin Academy, with a small portion zoned to Maverick Elementary. All such residents are zoned to Longfellow Middle School, and Jefferson High School, all in San Antonio.

Some of the city is served by the North East Independent School District. The portion is served by Dellview Elementary School, Jackson Middle School, and Lee High School, all in San Antonio.

References

External links

 Balcones Heights official website

Cities in Bexar County, Texas
Cities in Texas
Populated places established in 1948
Greater San Antonio
Enclaves in the United States